North Miami is a town in Ottawa County, Oklahoma, United States. The population was 290 at the 2020 census. North Miami is part of the Joplin, Missouri metropolitan area. The town is primarily a bedroom community for several larger towns in the county.

Geography
North Miami is located at  (36.918564, -94.880402). 

It is south of Commerce, Oklahoma. The Miami Regional Airport is to the southwest.

Demographics

As of the census of 2000, there were 433 people, 169 households, and 125 families residing in the town. There were 194 housing units at an average density of 1,000.4 per square mile (394.2/km2). The racial makeup of the town was 64.20% White, 21.94% Native American, 0.23% Asian, 2.77% from other races, and 10.85% from two or more races. Hispanic or Latino of any race were 4.39% of the population.

There were 169 households, out of which 33.1% had children under the age of 18 living with them, 53.8% were married couples living together, 12.4% had a female householder with no husband present, and 26.0% were non-families. 23.1% of all households were made up of individuals, and 10.7% had someone living alone who was 65 years of age or older. The average household size was 2.56 and the average family size was 3.00.

In the town, the population was spread out, with 28.6% under the age of 18, 9.5% from 18 to 24, 24.9% from 25 to 44, 21.9% from 45 to 64, and 15.0% who were 65 years of age or older. The median age was 36 years. For every 100 females, there were 89.1 males. For every 100 females age 18 and over, there were 96.8 males.

The median income for a household in the town was $23,125, and the median income for a family was $30,521. Males had a median income of $26,806 versus $17,708 for females. The per capita income for the town was $10,087. About 13.0% of families and 15.9% of the population were below the poverty line, including 12.6% of those under age 18 and 19.6% of those age 65 or over.

Education
It is within the Commerce Public Schools school district.

References

External links

Towns in Ottawa County, Oklahoma
Towns in Oklahoma